Ectonucleotide pyrophosphatase/phosphodiesterase family member 1 (PC-1, CD203a) is an enzyme that in humans is encoded by the ENPP1 gene.

Structure 
This gene is a member of the ecto-nucleotide pyrophosphatase/phosphodiesterase (ENPP) family. The encoded protein is a type II transmembrane glycoprotein comprising two identical disulfide-bonded subunits.

Function 
ENPP1 has broad specificity and cleaves a variety of substrates, including phosphodiester bonds of nucleotides and nucleotide sugars. ENPP1 protein may function to hydrolyze nucleoside 5' triphosphates to their corresponding monophosphates and may also hydrolyze diadenosine polyphosphates. 

The main substrate of ENNP1 is adenosine triphosphate (ATP), which is cleaved into adenosine monophosphate (AMP) and diphosphate.  Another notable nucleotide substrate is nicotinamide adenine dinucleotide (NAD+) which can be hydrolyzed to produce AMP. ADPR can also be hydrolyzed by ENNP1 to produce AMP.

Clinical significance 
Mutations in this gene have been associated with Generalized arterial calcification of infancy, ossification of the posterior longitudinal ligament of the spine (OPLL), Hypophosphatemic rickets autosomal recessive 2 (ARHR2), and insulin resistance.

In a tumor microenvironment, AMP generated by ENNP1 can lead to production of adenosine, which suppresses the anti-cancer function of the immune system.

Interactions 

Ectonucleotide pyrophosphatase/phosphodiesterase 1 has been shown to interact with Insulin receptor.

References

Further reading